The Private Blog of Joe Cowley is a teen realistic fiction novel series by British author Ben Davis, and also the title of the first book in the series. 

The four books in the series are The Private Blog of Joe Cowley (2014), Return of the Geek (2015), Welcome to Cringefest, 2016 and Straight Outta Nerdsville (2017). The books are published by Oxford University Press.

The books follow the mishaps of 14 year old Joe Cowley, who loves Star Trek, fails horribly at impressing girls and hangs out with his friends Harry and Ad, who want to go to a fictional music festival called Buzzfest. He lives with his stepbrother Gav, who bullied him at the start of the first book as well as his mum and her boyfriend "Jim the Plasterer". The series was received well by critics, praising its humour and characters.

Books in the series

References

External links
 Author's official website

Young adult novel series